The 1958 Hawaii Rainbows football team represented the University of Hawaiʻi at Mānoa as an independent during the 1958 NCAA College Division football season. In their seventh season under head coach Hank Vasconcellos, the Rainbows compiled a 5–7 record.

Schedule

References

Hawaii
Hawaii Rainbow Warriors football seasons
Hawaii Rainbows football